Huajiachi Campus (Traditional Chinese: 浙江大學華傢池校區, Simplified Chinese: 浙江大学华家池校区), is a major urban campus of Zhejiang University.

Introduction

The campus includes a famous lake named Huajiachi, which is the second largest lake in Hangzhou after West Lake. Hua (華/华) is a common Chinese surname, and jia (家) means family in Chinese; so Huajia implies that this place probably belonged to the Hua family in ancient times. Chi (池) stands for lake. The campus is named after the lake.

Before 1998, it was the campus of Zhejiang Agricultural University (ZAU).  In 1998, the university was merged into Zhejiang University. In fact, before 1953, the ZAU was an agriculture school of Zhejiang University, so it was a kind of rejoining, the same as the previous Hangzhou University, Zhejiang Medical University. etc.

The campus encompasses a total surface of 1484 mu, with a constructional area of 0.3 million m2. It includes a botanical garden, which is the first one in modern Chinese history.

Institutions 

 School of Continuing Education
 School of Medicine (research)

References 

Huajiachi Campus, Zhejiang University